Francis Cornu (4 October 1794 – 7 March 1848) was a French playwright.

Biography 
After he made excellent studies in Paris, he lost his father and at the young age of 17, had to work for a living. He entered as an employee at the prefecture of Nièvre. In 1815, suspected of supporting the Bourbons, he was removed from office. He then entered into business house then into a bank where he became chief clerk.

Having already composed verses in Latin, he made his debut in 1816 in Lyon in the vaudeville genre. In 1819, he moved to Paris and worked again first as a bank clerk (1819-1825). His first plays did not get any success. Le forçat libéré in 1829, performed at the Ambigu-Comique was even booed. Finally, it is Isaure which was met with success that made him known.

His plays, including many in collaboration with Auguste Anicet-Bourgeois, will then be regularly performed on the most important Parisian stages of the 19th century: Théâtre du Gymnase dramatique, Théâtre de l'Ambigu-Comique, Théâtre des Variétés etc.

In 1841, he became managing director of the Theatre at Antwerp.

Works 
 La suite de je fais mes farces, vaudeville, 1816
 L'Enfant de Paris ou le débit de consolations, lithographies in action, with Armand d'Artois and Gabriel de Lurieu, 1823
 Partie et revanche, comédie en vaudevilles in 1 act, with Nicolas Brazier and Eugène Scribe, 1823
 Les Acteurs à l’auberge, comedy in 1 act, with Maurice Alhoy and Armand-François Jouslin de La Salle, 1825
 Isaure, drame en 3 actes, mingled with song, with Benjamin Antier and Théodore Nézel, 1829
 Le Forçat libéré, melodrama in three acts, with Armand Séville, 1829
 Napoléon, historical play in three parts, mingled with songs, with Auguste Anicet-Bourgeois, 1830
 Une nuit au Palais-Royal, ou la Garde nationale en 1830, tableau-vaudeville, with A. Bourgeois, 1830
 La Belle-Fille, comédie en vaudevilles in 1 act, with A. Bourgeois, 1831
 Le Boa, ou le Bossu à la mode, comédie en vaudevilles in 1 act, with Achille d'Artois, 1831
 Les Chouans, ou Coblentz et Quiberon, drama in 3 acts, with A. Bourgeois, 1831
 Le Grenadier de l'île d'Elbe, play in three acts, mingled with songs, with A.Bourgeois, 1831
 Jeannette, melodrama in three acts and 6 periods, with A. Bourgeois, 1831
 Le Nouveau Sargines, ou l'École des malins, vaudeville in 1 act, 1831
 Le savetier de Toulouse, drama in 4 acts, 1832
 Les Deux diligences, comédie en vaudevilles in 1 act, with A. Bourgeois, 1832
 Franklin à Passy ou le Bonhomme Richard, vaudeville anecdotique en 1 act, with Frédéric de Courcy, 1832
 Sophie, ou le Mauvais ménage, drama in three acts, with Merville, 1832
 Tom-Rick, ou le Babouin, play in three acts, with Armand d'Artois, 1832
 La Chanoinesse, vaudeville in one act, with Eugène Scribe, 1833
 Le Festin de Balthazar, sacred drama in 5 acts, mingled with chorus, with Gustave Robillard, 1833
 Indiana, drama in 5 parts, with Léon Halévy, 1833
 Valentine ou Le Château de la Ferme, melodrama in five acts, with Guilbert de Pixérécourt, 1834
 Les mineurs, melodrama in three acts, with A. Bourgeois, 1835
 Héloïse et Abeilard, drama in five acts, with Auguste Anicet-Bourgeois, 1836 
 Nabuchodonosor, drama in four acts, with A. Bourgeois and Pierre Elzéar, 1836
 Le spectre et l'orpheline, drama in four acts, with A. Bourgeois, 1836
 Jérusalem délivrée, play in 4 acts and 10 tableaux, 1836
 Austerlitz, événement historique in three periods and eight tableaux, 1837
 Pauvre mère !, drama in five acts, with Hippolyte Auger, 1837
 L’Élève de Saint-Cyr, drama in five acts, 1838
 Le Château de Saint-Germain, drama in five acts, with Léon Halévy, 1840
 Les Chevilles de maître Adam, menuisier de Nevers, ou les Poètes artisans, 1-act comedy, mingled with couplets, 1841
 Marie ou l'Inondation, drama un five acts and six tableaux, with Auguste Anicet-Bourgeois, 1846

Bibliography 
 Felix Delhasse, Annuaire dramatique de la Belgique, vol.4, 1842, (p. 114) 
 Victor Couailhac, La vie de théâtre, 1864, (pp. 206–207)
 Jules Guex, Le Théâtre et la société française: de 1815 à 1848, 1900, (p. 115)
 Simone Bernard-Griffiths, Jean Sgard, Mélodrames et romans noirs: 1750–1890, 2000, (p. 279)

19th-century French dramatists and playwrights
People from Nièvre
1794 births
1848 deaths